The  is a theatre in Chiyoda, Tokyo, Japan. 
It is located in the Nissay Hibiya Building, designed by the architect Togo Murano. It was completed in 1963 and opened with a performance by the Deutsche Oper Berlin. Since then it has been used to stage productions of the performing arts, Kabuki, operas, and musicals. For many years, until the company acquired its first permanent theater, it staged numerous productions by the Shiki Theatre Company.

Togo Murano buildings
Theatres completed in 1963
Theatres in Tokyo
Buildings and structures in Chiyoda, Tokyo
Nippon Life
1963 establishments in Japan